The Textile, Clothing and Footwear Union of Australia (TCFUA) was a trade union in Australia. It represented a wide range of workers from the textile, clothing, footwear and felt hatting industries.

The TCFUA was formed 1 July 1992 by the merger of the Amalgamated Footwear & Textile Workers' Union of Australia and the Clothing & Allied Trades Union of Australia. It was affiliated with the Australian Council of Trade Unions. In 2018, the TCFUA merged into the CFMMEU.

External links

 TCFUA official site.

Defunct trade unions of Australia
Textile and clothing trade unions
Trade unions established in 1992
1992 establishments in Australia